The placename Osterode can refer to:
 Osterode (district) in Germany
 Osterode am Harz in Germany
 Ostróda (Osterode in Ostpreußen) in Poland (part of Germany until 1945)
 a district of the climatic spa Neustadt/Harz, Germany (Thuringia)